An independence referendum was held in New Caledonia on 4 October 2020. The poll was the second to be held under the terms of the Nouméa Accord, following a similar referendum in 2018.

Independence was rejected, with 53.26 percent of voters opposing such a change, a slight drop from the 2018 result in which 56.7 percent voted "no". Turnout was 85.69 percent. The Nouméa Accord permitted one further referendum to be held, should the Congress of New Caledonia vote for it. This third referendum was held in December 2021.

Background

New Caledonia was formally annexed by France in 1853, and Europeans and Polynesians, as well as other settlers, have since made the indigenous Kanaks a minority (27%, 11% and 39% respectively in the 2014 census). The territory was used as a penal colony from 1864 to 1897, and the Kanaks were excluded from the French economy and from mining work, and ultimately confined to reservations. Between 1976 and 1988, conflicts between the French government and the independence movement saw periods of serious violence and disorder (culminating in the Ouvéa cave hostage taking in 1988), with the emerging Kanak independence movement gaining support from many Kanaks frustrated with their lower socio-economic status and lack of involvement in the economy, seen as problems caused by the French exploitation. Though GDP per capita (nominal) is high at $38,921 and though New Caledonia is a major producer of nickel, there is significant inequality in income distribution, with many claiming that the mining revenue benefits people outside the territory and its (declining) mining communities.

Since 1986, the United Nations Committee on Decolonization has included New Caledonia on the United Nations list of non-self-governing territories.  The 1987 New Caledonia independence referendum, the first referendum on independence, was held the following year on 13 September 1987, but independence was rejected by a large majority, with 842 people (1.7%) voting for independence and 48,611 people (98.3%) voting to remain a part of France. Many pro-independence groups, such as the Kanak and Socialist National Liberation Front (FLNKS), boycotted the vote.

The Matignon Agreements, signed on 26 June 1988 by Jean-Marie Tjibaou and Jacques Lafleur, set up a ten-year period of stability and made certain provisions for the Kanak population. The Nouméa Accord, signed 5 May 1998 by the French government and the main independence and anti-independence parties, set in motion a 20-year transition period that transferred certain powers to the local government and laid the groundwork for an independence referendum in 2018.

In accordance with the Nouméa Accord, New Caledonians are allowed up to three referendums on independence; the first in 2018, then two more in 2020 and 2022 if the previous ones had not resulted in independence, but one-third of members of the Congress of New Caledonia voted for another one. The first was held in November 2018, with voters rejecting independence by 56.7 percent.

In 2019, members of the Caledonian Union, Future with Confidence, the Kanak and Socialist National Liberation Front (FLNKS) and the National Union for Independence requested another referendum be held.

Franchise
The referendum was held using a special electoral roll. Potential voters had to be registered on the general electoral roll, and also meet one of the secondary criteria:
Was on the electoral roll for the 1998 referendum on the Nouméa Accord;
Qualified to be on the electoral roll for the 1998 referendum, but were not enrolled;
Failed to meet the requirements to be on the 1998 electoral roll solely due to absence related to family, medical or professional reasons;
Having civil customary status, or born in New Caledonia and have their material interests in the territory;
At least one parent born in New Caledonia and have their material interests in the territory;
At least 20 years of continuous residence in New Caledonia by 31 December 2014;
Born before 1 January 1989 and have had their residence in New Caledonia between 1988 and 1998
Born after 31 December 1988 and reached voting age before the referendum, with at least one parent who was on the electoral roll (or qualified to do so) for the 1998 referendum.

As a consequence of these restrictions, in the 2018 referendum 35,948 registered voters on the general list were thus excluded from the vote, equating to 17.11% out of a total of 210,105 registered voters on the general electoral roll. Vote restriction restricts the voting power of recent inhabitants—also known as Zoreilles—and enlarges the voting power of native Kanaks, and was long sought after by FLNKS.

Campaign and voting
Campaigns were run by the Front de libération nationale kanak et socialiste (FLNKS) and the Mouvement nationaliste pour la souveraineté de Kanaky (Nationalist Movement for the Sovereignty of Kanaky), representing parties who supported independence, and the loyalistes who wanted the territory to remain French. Les Loyalistes included the political parties L'Avenir en confiance and the National Rally, while the secessionists were led by the Labour Party.

Campaign issues included rights to the exploitation of nickel in New Caledonia, The French government and loyalists regarded the nickel as one of its strategic assets, as well as an important source of income and employment for the islanders, while separatists were sceptical of the benefits to them with foreign companies operating the plants, as well as criticising pollution from the industry and its effect on the vital local sectors of agriculture and fisheries.

After abstaining from participating in the 2018 referendum, in July 2020 the anti-globalisation Labour Party announced it would call for its supporters to vote for independence in the upcoming referendum.

The referendum was held on 4 October 2020. Voting on the day was largely held peacefully, although Loyalists alleged that there was intimidation and racist targeting of European Caledonian voters by Kanaks in a few localities.

Results and aftermath

With a turnout of 85.6 percent, 53.26 percent of voters opted for "no", with the result that the islands remain French. This was a lower figure than the 2018 poll, in which 56.7 percent voted "no". Results were strongly polarised geographically, with 71 percent of South Province residents rejecting independence, while the smaller other two provinces, North Province and Loyalty Islands Province, voted "yes" by 76 percent and 82 percent respectively. In almost every commune, the share of "yes" votes increased.

As this was the second of three permitted independence referendums, it was expected that there may be a third and final referendum at some point before 2022. Daniel Goa, of the pro-independence party Caledonian Union, expressed a hope that the shift in vote share towards the "yes" camp would lead to a successful third referendum. Meanwhile Sonia Backès, leader of Les Loyalistes, called for dialogue between the two sides although she acknowledged that it might be necessary to hold the third referendum before such a dialogue could commence.

French president Emmanuel Macron expressed gratitude for the result, thanking New Caledonians for their "vote of confidence" in the Republic. He also acknowledged those who had backed independence, calling for dialogue between all sides to map out the future of the region.

In April 2021, 26 pro-independence members of Congress requested that a third vote take place. On 2 June, the French government announced that the third referendum was scheduled for 12 December 2021. This third referendum resulted in an overwhelming rejection of independence, with 96.49% of the electorate voting against independence and 3.51% for independence. However, turnout was significantly lower than in past referendums at only 43.90%.

See also 
2019 Bougainvillean independence referendum
2022 Chuukese independence referendum
Decolonisation of Oceania

References

Independence referendum
New Caledonia
New Caledonia
October 2020 events in Oceania
Referendums in New Caledonia
Separatism in France
Separatism in Oceania